Acacia cuthbertsonii is a perennial shrub or tree native to arid parts of inland and north western Australia.

Description
Like most species of Acacia it has phyllodes rather than true leaves. The silvery evergreen phyllodes have an elliptic to linear shape and can be straight to slightly incurved. When it blooms between January or April to December it produces simple inflorescences that are found in pairs in the axils.

Distribution
The species is found in drier areas of Western Australia and the Northern Territory. It is found in a variety of situations including on stony rises, gibber plains, and along creeks and drainage lines where it grows in stony sandy or loamy soils.

Uses 
The plant is used as an analgesic, in particular headaches and toothaches, by Aboriginal Australians of the Northern Territory.  The tree's wood is used to make splints to treat bone fractures.  Certain parts of the tree are used to make bandages.

Subspecies 
Acacia cuthbertsonii subsp. cuthbertsonii
Acacia cuthbertsonii subsp. linearis

See also
List of Acacia species

References 

cuthbertsonii
Trees of Australia
Fabales of Australia
Flora of the Northern Territory
Acacias of Western Australia
Plants described in 1897